Giacomo Neri (1 January 1916 – 6 May 2010) was an Italian professional football player and coach.

A right winger, Neri played a total 216 Serie A games, with 53 goals, throughout his career, and also played three games for the Italy national football team, scoring a goal.

He died in his home town of Faenza at the age of 94; he was the oldest living man at the time to have played for the Italy national team.

References

External links

1916 births
2010 deaths
People from Faenza
Italian footballers
Italy international footballers
Serie A players
U.S. Livorno 1915 players
Juventus F.C. players
Genoa C.F.C. players
Inter Milan players
Delfino Pescara 1936 players
Italian football managers
U.S. Alessandria Calcio 1912 managers
S.S.D. Lucchese 1905 managers
Association football forwards
Footballers from Emilia-Romagna
Sportspeople from the Province of Ravenna